Waxy keratosis of childhood (also known as "Kerinokeratosis papulosa") is a keratotic, flesh-colored papule that is either sporadic or familial, and may be generalized or segmental.

See also
 Epidermis
 Skin lesion

References

Epidermal nevi, neoplasms, and cysts